Cracking the Cryptic (CTC) is a YouTube channel dedicated to paper-and-pencil puzzles: primarily sudoku, but also cryptic crosswords and other types of number-placement, pencil, and word puzzles. They occasionally stream puzzle games on YouTube.

The channel was set up in 2017 by two friends from England: Simon Anthony, a former investment banker, and Mark Goodliffe, a financial director. 
Anthony is a former member of the UK's world sudoku and world puzzle championship teams, while Goodliffe is a 12-time winner of the Times Crossword Championships and UK sudoku champion.

Each video is generally composed of one of the two hosts presenting a puzzle with given rules and then solving it in real time, with their live commentary. The channel features both standard and variant puzzles.

During the COVID-19 pandemic, the channel grew in popularity, and  it had 245,000 subscribers, with the most popular video receiving over 4 million views.

The music played at the beginning and end of many videos is Mozart's Piano Sonata No. 16, nicknamed Sonata facile or Sonata semplice.

Other activities 

The channel has produced eight Sudoku apps based on Sudoku variants: Classic, Chess, Miracle, Sandwich, Thermo, Killer, Arrow, and Domino Sudoku.

In October 2020, a Kickstarter crowdfunding campaign was announced in order to produce a physical book with some of the channel's most popular puzzles. The campaign reached its initial target within 24 hours.

In addition to paper-and-pencil puzzles, the pair stream puzzle video games such as The Witness, Baba Is You and Return of the Obra Dinn.

References

External links
 
 

Sudoku
English-language YouTube channels